The boys' 1000 metres in short track speed skating at the 2020 Winter Youth Olympics was held on 18 January at the Lausanne Skating Arena.

Results

Heats
 Q – qualified for the quarterfinals

Quarterfinals
 Q – qualified for the semifinals

Semifinals
 QA – qualified for Final A
 QB – qualified for Final B

Final B

Final A
The final A was held at 13:51.

References

Boys' 1000m